Brahmaea paukstadtorum is a moth in the family Brahmaeidae. It was described by Stefan Naumann and Ulrich Brosch in 2005. It is found on Negros Island in the Philippines.

References

Brahmaeidae
Moths described in 2005